Gingeras is a surname. Notable people with the surname include:

Alison M. Gingeras (born 1973), American curator and writer
Thomas Gingeras, American geneticist
Ryan Gingeras, American historian

See also